The 1st constituency of Ariège is a French legislative constituency, covering the south of the Ariège département.

Deputies

Elections

2023 by-election
The 2022 election was annulled in January, 2023 by the Constitutional Council, due to an error in the count procedures. The by-election takes place on March 26th and April 2nd, 2023.

2022

 
 
 
 
 
|-
| colspan="8" bgcolor="#E9E9E9"|
|-

2017

2012
Won in the first round.

2007

|- style="background-color:#E9E9E9;text-align:center;"
! colspan="2" rowspan="2" style="text-align:left;" | Candidate
! rowspan="2" colspan="2" style="text-align:left;" | Party
! colspan="2" | 1st round
! colspan="2" | 2nd round
|- style="background-color:#E9E9E9;text-align:center;"
! width="75" | Votes
! width="30" | %
! width="75" | Votes
! width="30" | %
|-
| style="background-color:" |
| style="text-align:left;" | Frédérique Massat
| style="text-align:left;" | Socialist Party
| PS
| 
| 44.66%
| 
| 65.91%
|-
| style="background-color:" |
| style="text-align:left;" | Jacqueline Rouge
| style="text-align:left;" | Union for a Popular Movement
| UMP
| 
| 24.31%
| 
| 34.09%
|-
| style="background-color:" |
| style="text-align:left;" | Lyliane Cassan
| style="text-align:left;" | Communist
| COM
| 
| 6.83%
| colspan="2" style="text-align:left;" |
|-
| style="background-color:" |
| style="text-align:left;" | Patrick Pont
| style="text-align:left;" | Democratic Movement
| MoDem
| 
| 6.52%
| colspan="2" style="text-align:left;" |
|-
| style="background-color:" |
| style="text-align:left;" | Denis Seel
| style="text-align:left;" | Far Left
| EXG
| 
| 3.60%
| colspan="2" style="text-align:left;" |
|-
| style="background-color:" |
| style="text-align:left;" | Marc Saracino
| style="text-align:left;" | The Greens
| VEC
| 
| 3.31%
| colspan="2" style="text-align:left;" |
|-
| style="background-color:" |
| style="text-align:left;" | Jean-Luc Fernandez
| style="text-align:left;" | Hunting, Fishing, Nature, Traditions
| CPNT
| 
| 3.10%
| colspan="2" style="text-align:left;" |
|-
| style="background-color:" |
| style="text-align:left;" | Josette Zammit
| style="text-align:left;" | National Front
| FN
| 
| 2.68%
| colspan="2" style="text-align:left;" |
|-
| style="background-color:" |
| style="text-align:left;" | José Serrano
| style="text-align:left;" | Movement for France
| MPF
| 
| 2.12%
| colspan="2" style="text-align:left;" |
|-
| style="background-color:" |
| style="text-align:left;" | Sylvie Grizon
| style="text-align:left;" | Divers
| DIV
| 
| 1.26%
| colspan="2" style="text-align:left;" |
|-
| style="background-color:" |
| style="text-align:left;" | Didier Soulet
| style="text-align:left;" | Far Left
| EXG
| 
| 0.69%
| colspan="2" style="text-align:left;" |
|-
| style="background-color:" |
| style="text-align:left;" | Thierry Cuviller
| style="text-align:left;" | Far Right
| EXD
| 
| 0.47%
| colspan="2" style="text-align:left;" |
|-
| style="background-color:" |
| style="text-align:left;" | Véronique Bucaille
| style="text-align:left;" | Majorité Présidentielle
| 
| 
| 0.46%
| colspan="2" style="text-align:left;" |
|-
| colspan="8" style="background-color:#E9E9E9;"|
|- style="font-weight:bold"
| colspan="4" style="text-align:left;" | Total
| 
| 100%
| 
| 100%
|-
| colspan="8" style="background-color:#E9E9E9;"|
|-
| colspan="4" style="text-align:left;" | Registered voters
| 
| style="background-color:#E9E9E9;"|
| 
| style="background-color:#E9E9E9;"|
|-
| colspan="4" style="text-align:left;" | Blank/Void ballots
| 
| 2.91%
| 
| 5.06%
|-
| colspan="4" style="text-align:left;" | Turnout
| 
| 65.12%
| 
| 63.41%
|-
| colspan="4" style="text-align:left;" | Abstentions
| 
| 34.88%
| 
| 36.59%
|-
| colspan="8" style="background-color:#E9E9E9;"|
|- style="font-weight:bold"
| colspan="6" style="text-align:left;" | Result
| colspan="2" style="background-color:" | PS HOLD
|}

2002

 
 
 
 
 
 
 
 
 
 
|-
| colspan="8" bgcolor="#E9E9E9"|
|-

1997

 
 
 
 
 
 
 
 
|-
| colspan="8" bgcolor="#E9E9E9"|
|-

Sources

1